The 1964 United States presidential election in Louisiana took place on November 3, 1964, as part of the 1964 United States presidential election. Louisiana voters chose ten representatives, or electors, to the Electoral College, who voted for president and vice president.

Louisiana was won by Senator Barry Goldwater (R–Arizona), with 56.81% of the popular vote, against incumbent President Lyndon B. Johnson (D–Texas), with 43.19% of the popular vote. Goldwater became the first Republican to carry Louisiana without winning the presidency, while Johnson would win the national election in a landslide. , this is the last election in which Louisiana voted for a different candidate than neighboring Arkansas, and the last election in which Lafayette Parish voted for a Democratic presidential candidate.

Results

Results by parish

See also
 United States presidential elections in Louisiana

References

Louisiana
1964
1964 Louisiana elections